The Golden Horse Award for Best Makeup & Costume Design is an award presented annually at the Golden Horse Awards by the Taipei Golden Horse Film Festival Executive Committee. The latest ceremony was held in 2022, with Ken Fan and Chen You-feng winning the award for the film Demigod: The Legend Begins.

References

Golden Horse Film Awards